José Ahlers (born 15 January 1941) is a Uruguayan rower. He competed in the men's coxed pair event at the 1968 Summer Olympics.

References

1941 births
Living people
Uruguayan people of German descent
Uruguayan male rowers
Olympic rowers of Uruguay
Rowers at the 1968 Summer Olympics
People from Carmelo, Uruguay
20th-century Uruguayan people